Coventry High School is a public high school for grades 9 through 12 located in Coventry, Tolland County, Connecticut.  It is accredited by the New England Association of Schools and Colleges.

History

In 1956, the school district was formed and construction began on Coventry High School. The doors were opened and classes began on September 6, 1956.  The original structure contained four hallways and a somewhat central courtyard.  An expansion in 1970 added the existing technology education wing, an auxiliary gymnasium, locker room facilities, art area and new library.  It remained unchanged for over 30 years.

In 2001, a massive second renovation began which added a new science wing, computer lab, gymnasium with locker room facilities, a significantly larger auditorium, library and media center, band and music rooms and additional classrooms and storage space.  Two new courtyards were also created in the process.  Construction was substantially completed in the fall of 2002.

Enrollment data and statistics
Public school data from the 2004–2005 school year shows a total enrollment of 610 students. 96% White, 1% Hispanic, 1% Black, 1% Asian and 1% Native American/Alaskan.  36.9% of the students were male, 63.1% female.  Number of certified teachers (FTE): 45.7,  student/teacher Ratio: 14.8. Coventry High School had a total enrollment of 595 students as of June 2006.  Coventry High School had a total enrollment of 472 students as of May 2018.

Athletics
Baseball
Basketball - Boys 	
Basketball - Girls 	  	
Cross Country 		
Football
Golf	  	
Ice hockey 		
Soccer - Boys 	
Soccer - Girls 	
Softball 	  	
Tennis 	
Track and Field 		
Volleyball
Swimming
Lacrosse
Ultimate Frisbee (Coed)

Coventry teams have won championships in recent years: CHS Baseball won the CIAC Championship in 2019, and the CHS Volleyball team won the CIAC Championship in 2017, and came in second in 2018.

Academics

CHS offers Advanced Placement classes. Students are also able to earn college credits through the University of Connecticut's Early College Experience program, which are also transferable to other universities. CHS also offers classes through the Manchester Community College High School Partnership Program.

References

External links

Coventry Public Schools

Coventry, Connecticut
Schools in Tolland County, Connecticut
Educational institutions established in 1956
Public high schools in Connecticut
1956 establishments in Connecticut